Mantle cell lymphoma (MCL) is a type of non-Hodgkin's lymphoma (NHL), comprising about 6% of NHL cases. There are only about 15,000 patients presently in the United States with mantle cell lymphoma.  It is named for the mantle zone of the lymph nodes.

MCL is a subtype of B-cell lymphoma, due to CD5 positive antigen-naive pregerminal center B-cell within the mantle zone that surrounds normal germinal center follicles. MCL cells generally over-express cyclin D1 due to the t(11:14) translocation, a chromosomal translocation in the DNA.

Signs and symptoms
At diagnosis, patients typically are in their 60s and present to their physician with advanced disease. About half have B symptoms such as fever, night sweats, or unexplained weight loss (over 10% of body weight). Enlarged lymph nodes (for example, a "bump" on the neck, armpits or groin) or enlargement of the spleen are usually present. Bone marrow, liver and gastrointestinal tract involvement occurs relatively early in the course of the disease. Mantle cell lymphoma has been reported in rare cases to be associated with severe allergic reactions to mosquito bites. These reactions involve extensive allergic reactions to mosquito bites which range from greatly enlarged bite sites that may be painful and involve necrosis to systemic symptoms (e.g. fever, swollen lymph nodes, abdominal pain, and diarrhea), or, in extremely rare cases, to life-threatening anaphylaxis. In several of these cases, the mosquito bite allergy (MBA) reaction occurred prior to the diagnosis of MCL suggesting that MBA can be a manifestation of early-developing mantle cell lymphoma.

Pathogenesis

MCL, like most cancers, results from the acquisition of a combination of (non-inherited) genetic mutations in somatic cells. This leads to a clonal expansion of malignant B lymphocytes. The factors that initiate the genetic alterations are typically not identifiable, and usually occur in people with no particular risk factors for lymphoma development. Because it is an acquired genetic disorder, MCL is neither communicable nor inheritable.

A defining characteristic of MCL is mutation and overexpression of cyclin D1, a cell cycle gene, that contributes to the abnormal proliferation of the malignant cells. MCL cells may also be resistant to drug-induced apoptosis, making them harder to cure with chemotherapy or radiation. Cells affected by MCL proliferate in a nodular or diffuse pattern with two main cytologic variants, typical or blastic. Typical cases are small to intermediate-sized cells with irregular nuclei. Blastic (aka blastoid) variants have intermediate to large-sized cells with finely dispersed chromatin, and are more aggressive in nature. The tumor cells accumulate in the lymphoid system, including lymph nodes and the spleen, with non-useful cells eventually rendering the system dysfunctional. MCL may also replace normal cells in the bone marrow, which impairs normal blood cell production.

Diagnosis

Diagnosis generally requires stained slides of a surgically removed part of a lymph node. Other methods are also commonly used, including cytogenetics and fluorescence in situ hybridization (FISH). Polymerase chain reaction (PCR) and CER3 clonotypic primers are additional methods, but are less often used.

The immunophenotype profile consists of CD5+ (in about 80% of cases), CD10-/+, and it is usually CD5+ and CD10-. CD20+, CD23-/+ (though plus in rare cases). Generally, cyclin D1 is expressed. Cyclin D1-negative mantle cell lymphoma can be diagnosed by detecting the SOX11 marker. The workup for mantle cell lymphoma is similar to the workup for many indolent lymphomas and certain aggressive lymphomas.

Mantle cell lymphoma is a systemic disease with frequent involvement of the bone marrow and gastrointestinal tract (generally showing polyposis in the lining). There is also a not-uncommon leukemic phase, marked by its presence in the blood. For this reason, both the peripheral blood and bone marrow are evaluated for the presence of malignant cells. Chest, abdominal, and pelvic CT scans are routinely performed.

Since mantle cell lymphoma may present a lymphomatous polyposis coli and colon involvement is common, colonoscopy is considered a routine part of the evaluation. Upper endoscopy and neck CT scan may be helpful in selected cases. In some patients with the blastic variant, lumbar puncture is done to evaluate the spinal fluid for involvement.

CT scan 

PET scan

Treatments
There are no proven standards of treatment for MCL, and there is no consensus among specialists on how to treat it optimally. Many regimens are available and often get good response rates, but patients almost always get disease progression after chemotherapy. Each relapse is typically more difficult to treat, and relapse is generally faster. Regimens are available that treat relapses, and new approaches are under test. Because of the aforementioned factors, many MCL patients enroll in clinical trials to get the latest treatments.

There are four classes of treatments in general use: chemotherapy, immunotherapy, radioimmunotherapy and biologic agents. The phases of treatment are generally: frontline, following diagnosis, consolidation, after frontline response (to prolong remissions), and relapse. Relapse is usually experienced multiple times.

Chemotherapy
Chemotherapy is widely used as frontline treatment, and often is not repeated in relapse due to side effects. Alternate chemotherapy is sometimes used at first relapse. For frontline treatment, CHOP with rituximab is the most common chemotherapy, and often given as outpatient by IV. A stronger chemotherapy with greater side effects (mostly hematologic) is HyperCVAD, often given in the hospital setting, with rituximab and generally to fitter patients (some of which are over 65). HyperCVAD is becoming popular and showing promising results, especially with rituximab. It can be used on some elderly (over 65) patients, but seems only beneficial when the baseline Beta-2-MG blood test was normal. It is showing better complete remissions (CR) and progression-free survival (PFS) than CHOP regimens. A less intensive option is bendamustine with rituximab.

Second line treatment may include fludarabine, combined with cyclophosphamide and/or mitoxantrone, usually with rituximab. Cladribine and clofarabine are two other medications being investigated in MCL. A relatively new regimen that uses old medications is PEP-C, which includes relatively small, daily doses of prednisone, etoposide, procarbazine, and cyclophosphamide, taken orally, has proven effective for relapsed patients. According to Dr. John Leonard, PEP-C may have anti-angiogenetic properties, something that he and his colleagues are testing through an ongoing drug trial.

Another approach involves using very high doses of chemotherapy, sometimes combined with total body irradiation (TBI), in an attempt to destroy all evidence of the disease. The downside to this is the destruction of the patient's entire immune system as well, requiring rescue by transplantation of a new immune system (hematopoietic stem cell transplantation), using either autologous stem cell transplantation, or those from a matched donor (an allogeneic stem cell transplant). A presentation at the December 2007 American Society of Hematology (ASH) conference by Christian Geisler, chairman of the Nordic Lymphoma Group claimed that according to trial results, mantle cell lymphoma is potentially curable with very intensive chemo-immunotherapy followed by a stem cell transplant, when treated upon first presentation of the disease.

These results seem to be confirmed by a large trial of the European Mantle Cell Lymphoma Network indicating that induction regimens containing monoclonal antibodies and high dose ARA-C (Cytarabine) followed by ASCT should become the new standard of care of MCL patients up to approximately 65 years.

A study released in April 2013 showed that patients with previously untreated indolent lymphoma, bendamustine plus rituximab can be considered as a preferred first-line treatment approach to R-CHOP because of increased progression-free survival and fewer toxic effects.

Immunotherapy
Immune-based therapy is dominated by the use of the rituximab monoclonal antibody, sold under the trade name Rituxan (or as Mabthera in Europe and Australia). Rituximab may have good activity against MCL as a single agent, but it is typically given in combination with chemotherapies, which prolongs response duration. There are newer variations on monoclonal antibodies combined with radioactive molecules known as radioimmunotherapy (RIT). These include Zevalin and Bexxar. Rituximab has also been used in small numbers of patients in combination with thalidomide with some effect.  In contrast to these antibody-based 'passive' immunotherapies, the field of 'active' immunotherapy tries to activate a patient's immune system to specifically eliminate their own tumor cells.  Examples of active immunotherapy include cancer vaccines, adoptive cell transfer, and immunotransplant, which combines vaccination and autologous stem cell transplant.  Though no active immunotherapies are currently a standard of care, numerous clinical trials are ongoing.

Targeted therapy
Two Bruton tyrosine kinase inhibitors (BTKi), one In November 2013, ibrutinib (brand name Imbruvica, Pharmacyclics LLC) and one in October 2017, acalabrutinib (brand name Calquence, AstraZeneca Pharmaceuticals LP) were approved in the United States for treating mantle cell lymphoma.

In November 2019, zanubrutinib (Brukinsa) was approved in the United States with an indication for the treatment of adults with mantle cell lymphoma who have received at least one prior therapy.

Pirtobrutinib (Jaypirca) was approved for medical use in the United States in January 2023.

Gene therapy 
Brexucabtagene autoleucel (Tecartus) was approved for medical use in the United States in July 2020, with an indication for the treatment of adults with relapsed or refractory mantle cell lymphoma. It was approved for medical use in the European Union in December 2020.

Each dose of brexucabtagene autoleucel is a customized treatment created using the recipient's own immune system to help fight the lymphoma. The recipient's T cells, a type of white blood cell, are collected and genetically modified to include a new gene that facilitates the targeting and killing of the lymphoma cells. These modified T cells are then infused back into the recipient.

Prognosis
Recent clinical advances in mantle cell lymphoma (MCL) have seen standard‐of‐care treatment algorithms transformed. Frontline rituximab combination therapy, high dose cytarabine‐based induction in younger patients and, more recently, Bruton Tyrosine Kinase (BTK) inhibitors in the relapse setting have all demonstrated survival advantage in clinical trials (Wang et al., 2013; Eskelund et al., 2016; Rule et al., 2016). Over the last 15 years these practices have gradually become embedded in clinical practice and real‐world data has observed corresponding improvements in patient survival (Abrahamsson et al., 2014; Leux et al., 2014).

The overall 5-year survival rate for MCL is generally 50% (advanced stage MCL) to 70% (for limited-stage MCL).

Prognosis for individuals with MCL is problematic and indexes do not work as well due to patients presenting with advanced stage disease. Staging is used but is not very informative, since the malignant B-cells can travel freely though the lymphatic system and therefore most patients are at stage III or IV at diagnosis. Prognosis is not strongly affected by staging in MCL and the concept of metastasis does not really apply.

The Mantle Cell Lymphoma International Prognostic Index (MIPI) was derived from a data set of 455 advanced stage MCL patients treated in series of clinical trials in Germany/Europe. Of the evaluable population, approximately 18% were treated with high-dose therapy and stem cell transplantation in first remission. The MIPI is able to classify patients into three risk groups: low risk (median survival not reached after median 32 months follow-up and 5-year OS rate of 60%), intermediate risk (median survival 51 months) and high risk (median survival 29 months). In addition to the 4 independent prognostic factors included in the model, the cell proliferation index (Ki-67) was also shown to have additional prognostic relevance. When the Ki67 is available, a biologic MIPI can be calculated.

MCL is one of the few NHLs that can cross the boundary into the brain, yet it can be treated in that event.

There are a number of prognostic indicators that have been studied. There is not universal agreement on their importance or usefulness in prognosis.

Ki-67 is an indicator of how fast cells mature and is expressed in a range from about 10% to 90%. The lower the percentage, the lower the speed of maturity, and the more indolent the disease. Katzenberger et al. Blood 2006;107:3407 graphs survival versus time for subsets of patients with varying Ki-67 indices. He shows median survival times of about one year for 61-90% Ki-67 and nearly 4 years for 5-20% Ki-67 index.

MCL cell types can aid in prognosis in a subjective way. Blastic is a larger cell type. Diffuse is spread through the node. Nodular are small groups of collected cells spread through the node. Diffuse and nodular are similar in behavior. Blastic is faster growing and it is harder to get long remissions. Some thought is that given a long time, some non-blastic MCL transforms to blastic. Although survival of most blastic patients is shorter, some data shows that 25% of blastic MCL patients survive to 5 years. That is longer than diffuse type and almost as long as nodular (almost 7 yrs).

Beta-2 microglobulin is another risk factor in MCL used primarily for transplant patients. Values less than three have yielded 95% overall survival to six years for auto SCT where over three yields a median of 44 most overall survival for auto SCT (Khouri 03). This is not yet fully validated.

Testing for high levels of Lactate dehydrogenase (LDH) in NHL patients is useful because LDH is released when body tissues break down for any reason. While it cannot be used as a sole means of diagnosing NHL, it is a surrogate for tracking tumor burden in those diagnosed by other means. The normal range is approximately 100–190.

Epidemiology
6% of non-Hodgkin lymphoma cases are mantle cell lymphoma. , the ratio of males to females affected is about 4:1.

See also
 In situ mantle cell lymphoma
 List of hematologic conditions

References

Further reading

External links

Non-Hodgkin lymphoma